Abu'l Ghazi Sultan Alqas Mirza, better known as Alqas Mirza (15 March 1516 – 9 April 1550), was a Safavid prince and the second son of king (shah) Ismail I (r. 1501–1524). In early 1546, with Ottoman help, he staged a revolt against his brother Tahmasp I (r. 1524–1576), who was king at the time.

Biography

Of the four sons that survived of Ismail I, Alqas was the second one. Sam Mirza was probably his full brother, while Bahram Mirza and (the future king) Tahmasp were brothers born by other mothers. In 1532/33, he was given the governorship of Astarabad by Tahmasp (by that time king), while Badr Khan Ustajlu was made his regent (lala). In March 1538 Tahmasp I ordered Alqas with his regent to move against the rebel Shirvanshah, and six months later he was appointed governor of Shirvan, where he remained for the next eight years. During the frequent Caucasian campaigns under Tahmasp's tenure, Alqas was ordered to attack the Circassians, who however defeated him. Afterwards, he was appointed governor of Derbent (Darband). He started to openly revolt there, which included minting his own coins. Upon hearing of this, Tahmasp, at that time in a winter campaign in Georgia, started to march upon Derbent. Alqas subsequently fled Derbent, to Crimea, while by early 1547, Tahmasp had already re-taken Derbent.

As Crimea passed into Ottoman hands at that time, Alqas moved to Istanbul by sea, arriving there towards the end of summer 1547. At Istanbul, he contacted the Ottoman sultan Suleiman, explaining his reason of departure from Iran, as well as his desire to return there as an Ottoman client. Upon hearing this, Suleiman hastily moved from Edirne to meet the exiled Alqas, who promised strong Qizilbash support if Suleiman might help him, and he may have converted to Sunnism.
In 1550 he was executed by his brother, Tahmasp I.

See also
 Ottoman–Safavid War (1532–55)

References

Sources
 
 
 
 
 

1516 births
1550 deaths
Safavid princes
Safavid generals
Safavid governors of Astarabad
Safavid governors of Derbent
Safavid governors of Shirvan
Iranian defectors
Rebellions against Safavid Iran
People executed by Safavid Iran
16th-century people of Safavid Iran